The FIS Alpine World Ski Championships 1991 were held in Saalbach-Hinterglemm, Austria between 22 January and 3 February, 1991.

Sunshine often hit the snow of Saalbach-Hinterglemm during the competitions, which are remembered as some of the sunniest ever. The competitions also saw the international breakthroughs for skiers who would score major successes throughout the 1990s, like Austria's Stephan Eberharter. and Sweden's Pernilla Wiberg.

The United States Ski Team arrived late, after two races had been completed. Due to the Gulf War and associated security concerns, the team had withdrawn from World Cup competitions the previous week and returned home to North America.

Men's competitions

Downhill
Sunday, 27 January 1991

Super-G
Wednesday, 23 January 1991

Giant Slalom
Sunday, 3 February 1991

Slalom
Tuesday, 22 January 1991

Combination
Monday, 28 January 1991   (downhill)
Wednesday, 30 January 1991   (2 slalom runs)

Women's competitions

Downhill
Saturday, 26 January 1991

Super G
Tuesday, 29 January 1991

Giant Slalom
Saturday, 2 February 1991

Slalom
Friday, 1 February 1991

Combination
Friday, 25 January 1991   (downhill)
Thursday, 31 January 1991   (2 slalom runs)

Medals table
References

External links
FIS-ski.com – results – 1991 World Championships – Saalbach-Hinterglemm, Austria
FIS-ski.com – results – World Championships

FIS Alpine World Ski Championships
1991 in Austrian sport
1991
A
Kitzbühel Alps
Alpine skiing competitions in Austria
January 1991 sports events in Europe
February 1991 sports events in Europe